Hendrik Hondius I (born Hendrik de Hondt; 9 June 1573 – ) was a Flemish-born and trained engraver, cartographer, and publisher who settled in the Dutch Republic in 1597.

Life 
He was born as the son of Guillam (Willem) de Hondt, a philologist, in Duffel (Duchy of Brabant in Flanders). The 17th century Flemish biographer Cornelis de Bie reports that Hondius' father was a learned man who moved with his family to Mechelen. Here the young Hondius learned to write. After the death of his father he moved with his mother to Antwerp. After his mother's marriage to a citizen of Antwerp, Hondius was apprenticed in Brussels to Godfried van Ghelder, goldsmith to Alexander Farnese, Duke of Parma. He also studied drawing with the engraver Jan Wierix of Antwerp. At this time he started to study engraving. He applied himself to mathematics and studied perspective, architecture and the construction of fortifications with Hans Vredeman de Vries and Samuel Marelois.

After travelling to Cologne, London and Paris, he moved to The Hague by 1597. That year he registered in the local artists’ guild and married the daughter of a goldsmith of The Hague. He obtained his first print privilege for a portrait of Prince Maurits. He dedicated himself to his engraving practice. His work was very well received and he got commissions from many eminent personalities for engravings or drawings.

He was granted a general privilege by the States General of the Netherlands in 1599. Hondius was thus the first publisher to obtain a national privilege until Peter Paul Rubens in 1618. The privilege provided protection against circulation in the Dutch Republic of copies of his published works. He moved to Amsterdam in 1603 and Leiden in 1604–1605. Here he published with the printer Breukel Cornelisz Nieulandt of The Hague the book Perspective by Hans Vredeman de Vries. He returned to settle in The Hague in 1605. After his return to The Hague his prints displayed the Buitenhof as his address. The young Constantijn Huygens followed in 1611 for three months drawing classes with Hondius. Hondius bought in 1614 a large house between the Binnenhof and the Gevangenpoort in The Hague which he used as work and living quarters. He joined in 1617 the local church counsel where he adopted an anti-catholic and anti-arminian standpoint.

He had a flourishing printing business in The Hague, which was continued by his sons Willem and Hendrik. Initially he hired printers to do his printing until he bought his own printing press in 1620. He turned more to publishing rather than engraving and printing in the 1630s. His publications were mainly maps, books about fortifications and official portraits. He also reused original plates and blocks by earlier artists for reprinting and such reprints represented almost a third of his publishing output. In the 1640s he returned to printing concentrating exclusively on etching. He remained active as a printmaker and draughtsman until his final years.

Effigies
One of the most important publications of Hondius was the work Pictorum aliquot celebrium praecipue Germaniae inferioris Effigies (Effigies of some celebrated painters, chiefly of Lower Germany) of 1610, which was a collection of 69 portraits of mainly Netherlandish artists. Of these portraits, 22 were reworked versions of portraits contained in a book with almost the same title by Dominicus Lampsonius that was published in Antwerp in 1572 by the widow of Hieronymous Cock. The 1572 book contained 23 portraits of early Netherlandish artists, all of whom had died before the publication, including a portrait of Hieronymous Cock who had died while preparing the publication. Through his 1610 book Hondius updated and expanded the canon of Netherlandish painting. He included some German and English artists in an apparent attempt to situate the Netherlanders within a broader, more semantically uncertain 'Northern' canon. Hondius constructed the series as part of a continual celebration of past and present Netherlandish artists. Hondius did not include in his book the portrait of Cock, which was the last portrait in the 1572 publication.

Hondius did not identify the authorship of the individual engravings (most of which were done by the Wierix brothers in the Lampsonius series). Like in the 1572 publication, he added Latin poems underneath each portrait with a short description of the specific qualities of each artist.

Publications
 Icones virorum nostra patriumque memoria illustrium, quorum opera cum literarum studia tumvera religio fuit restaurata, ab Henr. Hondio sculptae, aeneisque typis excusae, 1599 
 Praestantium aliquot theologorum qui Rom. Antichristum praecipue oppugnarunt, effigies, 1602, with Jacobus Verheiden
 With Hans Vredeman de Vries (whose portrait he engraved), a book on Perspective, Leiden, 1604–1605
 Pictorum aliquot celebrium praecipue Germaniae Inferioris effigies, Hagae Comitis, 1610
 Belgiae Pacificatorum vera delinealio. Pourtraicture vraye des pacificaleurs des Pays Bas. True likenesses of the peacemakers of the Netherlands, Hagae Comitis Ex off. Henri Hondii, 1608
 Topographia variarum regionum etc. ou les vues d'après nature, by Matthijs Bril, engraved by Henri Hondius, 1611, 1614 
 Pompe funèbre de Charles V, exécutée par ordre de Philippe II, Brussels, Joan à Duelecum, Luc. Duetecum fec. Hondius exec., 1619
 Korte Beschrijvinge ende afbeeldinge der generale regelen der fortificatie, der artillerie munitie ende vivres van deselver en hare commissien van de leger, aerde wallen de approchen met het legenweer ende van vyerwerken, Hagae-Comitis, 1624 
 Alghemeine regelen der sterkebouw, The Hague, 1625
 Theatrum honoris in quo nostri Apelles saeculi, seu pictorum, qui patrum nostrorum memoria vixerunt, celebriorum pracipue quos Belgium tulit, verae et advivum expressae imagines in aes incisae exhibeniur, Amsterdam, 1612, 1618 
 Les hommes illustres, gravés et imprimés par H.H. 
 Les portraits des hérésiarques et autres hommes illustres par H. Hondius, J. Muller, J. Matham, J. Stadeler, etc.

References

External links 

 Vermeer and The Delft School, a full text exhibition catalog from The Metropolitan Museum of Art, which contains material on Hendrik Hondius I
 Dem dry Bones. Portrayal in print after the death of the Original Model. An essay by Joanna Woodall.

17th-century cartographers
1573 births
1650 deaths
Dutch art historians
Dutch cartographers
Dutch engravers
Dutch Golden Age printmakers
Flemish cartographers
Flemish engravers
People from Duffel